George John Constantine (February 22, 1918 – January 7, 1968) was a racing driver from the United States. He competed nationally in 108 races between 1953 and 1962, winning 17 times.  Mr. Constantine was the United States Sports Car Driver of the Year in 1960.  He won the 1959 Nassau Trophy race and the 1956 grand prix at Watkins Glen, N.Y. (in a Jaguar D-type).  He set course records at Lime Rock, Conn. (1:05.81), and Marlboro, Md., in 1958, and he was one of the top-rated competitors in the 1959 Daytona, Fla. international speedway race.   Mr. Constantine was known as the "King of Lime Rock" and "The Flying Greek."  His most famous car with the most victories was the rare and fabulous Aston Martin DBR2/1 (owned by Elisha Walker, Jr.), and his mechanic was Rex Woodgate.

Complete Formula One results
(key)

References

1918 births
1968 deaths
American Formula One drivers
People from Southbridge, Massachusetts
Racing drivers from Massachusetts
Sportspeople from Worcester County, Massachusetts